Tennessee was admitted June 1, 1796. The first member of the U.S. House of Representatives was elected October 15 and seated December 5.

He was future U.S. President Andrew Jackson, a Democratic-Republican, who swamped James Rody 98.9% to 1.1%.

See also 
 1796–97 United States House of Representatives elections
 List of United States representatives from Tennessee

References 

1796
Tennessee
United States House of Representatives
Andrew Jackson